Apatetris caecivaga is a moth of the family Gelechiidae. It was described by Edward Meyrick in 1928. It is found in India (Punjab).

The wingspan is about 12 mm. The forewings are grey-whitish closely speckled fuscous. The plical and second discal stigmata are obscurely indicated by darker irroration. The hindwings are grey.

The larvae feed on Tamarix articulata.

References

Moths described in 1928
Apatetris
Moths of Asia